Dickson Greeting is an 1891 American short silent film. Directed, produced by, and starring motion-picture pioneer William K. L. Dickson, it displays a 3-second clip of him passing a hat in front of himself, and reaching for it with his other hand. It was filmed on May 20, 1891 in the Photographic Building at Edison's Black Maria studio, West Orange, New Jersey, in collaboration with Thomas Edison using his kinetograph. The film was played for viewers at the National Federation of Women's Clubs, one of the first public presentations of a motion picture.

References

External links

 Dickson Greeting, Library of Congress
 
 

1891 films
1890s American films
American black-and-white films
American silent short films
Films directed by William Kennedy Dickson
Films shot in New Jersey
Articles containing video clips
1891 short films